Julie Frost is an American songwriter, singer, guitarist and record producer. She is the recipient of Golden Globe and Eurovision Song Contest awards for songs written, as well as a Parent's Choice Award for album production and performance. She is also the founder of the non-profit "Songs For Elephants", with the mission to help mobilize the music and entertainment industry in support of the world's elephants.

She is the second American songwriter to win the Eurovision Song Contest, as co-writer of the song "Satellite", which won the contest for Germany. Frost co-wrote Madonna's song "Masterpiece", from the soundtrack of her movie W.E., and won a Golden Globe Award for Best Original Song.

Her songwriting credits include the Black Eyed Peas' multi-platinum single "Just Can't Get Enough", the hook for Pitbull's "Castle Made of Sand", and Flo Rida's "Sweet Spot".  She also co-wrote Beyoncé's single "Countdown", Ed Sheeran's "Kiss Me", Marina and the Diamonds's "Primadonna",  Frost wrote the end credit song and lead single for the "Endless Love" Soundtrack performed by Tegan and Sara and co-wrote "Lift Me Up" featuring Nico and Vinz and Ladysmith Black Mambazo on Guetta's album "Listen", and co-wrote Charlie Puth's single "Marvin Gaye" with Charlie Puth featuring Meghan Trainor.  Additionally, Frost co-wrote the single "Obsession" for DJ Vice Featuring Kyle and Jon Bellion.  Most recently, she co-wrote "Ring" for Selena Gomez album "Rare", and "Oh My God" for Alec Benjamin's album "These Two Windows". She is nominated for a 2020 Latin Grammy Award with her song "Love" cowritten with Jesse & Joy, on their album "Aire".

Early life and career 
Frost grew up in rural Vermont and began to perform publicly in 1992 in Chicago. Her first solo album The Wave (2002) was received positively by various music critics;... Of her writing style, Music Critic Johny Luftus wrote "Chicago singer/songwriter Julie Frost likes to place pleading heartache, clever wordplay, and determined pluck over nuanced arrangements". Later on Frost founded her own studio "Happy Child Studios", which produces songs for families and children, and published her album Happy Child Music (2006).

2009 to present 
Frost was signed to EMI Music Publishing in 2009 by music executive Big Jon Platt.  In 2010, a song cowritten by Frost and Dane John Gorden, "Satellite", won the Eurovision Song Contest 2010 for Germany. Lena Meyer-Landrut's recording of this song subsequently became a number one hit in various European countries, and went to No. 1 on the European singles chart. It was also a minor hit in various other countries.

Discography 
 2006: Happy Child Music (Artist)
 2002: The Wave  (Artist)
 2000: "Songs for Wiggleworms" Various Artists (Artist/Producer)

Songwriting credits

Awards, nominations and certifications

Wins
 2001: Parent's Choice Award - "Songs For Wiggle Worms" (Producer)
 2010: Eurovision Song Contest - "Satellite"
 2010: 1LIVE Krone – Best Single "Satellite"
 2011: Golden Globe - Best Original Song "Masterpiece" (Madonna)

Nominations
 2011: Echo - Radio Echo for "Satellite" (Lena Meyer-Landrut)
 2011: Echo - Single of the Year – "Satellite" (Lena Meyer-Landrut)
 2011: Echo - Album of the Year – "My Cassette Player" (Lena Meyer-Landrut)
 2011: Comet - Best Song – "Satellite" (Lena Meyer-Landrut)
 2012: Brit - Album of the Year – "+" (Ed Sheeran)

Certifications
 2010 Triple Platinum Single Germany "Satellite" Lena Meyer-Landrut
 2010 Gold Single Sweden "Satellite" Lena Meyer-Landrut
 2010 Platinum Single Switzerland "Satellite" Lena Meyer-Landrut
 2010 5× Gold Album Germany My Cassette Player Lena Meyer-Landrut
 2011 Platinum Album U.S. "The Beginning" Black Eyed Peas
 2011 Platinum Album Australia "The Beginning" Black Eyed Peas
 2011 Platinum Single Australia "Just Can't Get Enough" Black Eyed Peas

References

External links 
 
 

Golden Globe Award-winning musicians
American women singers
Eurovision Song Contest winners
Living people
Year of birth missing (living people)
Singers from Vermont
American women songwriters
Songwriters from Oklahoma
21st-century American women